"Tell Me What He Said" is a 1960 pop song written by Jeff Barry.     The song was first recorded by American singer Ginny Arnell, as the B-side of her single "Look Who's Talkin'".   It was later recorded in Britain by Helen Shapiro, whose version reached number 2 on the UK singles chart in early 1962.

Chart performance
Helen Shapiro

References

1960 songs
Songs written by Jeff Barry
Columbia Graphophone Company singles
Helen Shapiro songs